Sir Luke Samuel Leake (1828–1886), M.L.C., was a Speaker of the Western Australian Legislative Council.

Biography

Early life
Luke Leake was born in 1828. He was the youngest son of Luke Leake, of Stoke Newington, Middlesex.

Career
He moved to Western Australia in 1833 (then known as the Swan River Colony), where he became a member of the Legislative Council, and was the first Speaker of that body, holding the position from 26 June 1872 until his death.

He was knighted by patent in 1876 and died in 1886.

Personal life
In 1855, he married Louisa, daughter of the late Rev. Thomas Henry Walpole, vicar of Winslow, Buckinghamshire, who married secondly, in 1887, Alfred Waylen, colonial surgeon, Western Australia.

Death
He died on 1 May 1886.

Notes

1828 births
1886 deaths
Settlers of Western Australia
People from Stoke Newington
English emigrants to Australia
Speakers of the Western Australian Legislative Council
19th-century Australian politicians
Australian Knights Bachelor
Australian politicians awarded knighthoods
Date of birth missing
Place of birth missing
Place of death missing